Tut-e Seyyed Mohammad (also Romanized as Tūt-e Seyyed Moḩammad) is a village in Jannatabad Rural District, Salehabad County, Razavi Khorasan Province, Iran. At the 2006 census, its population was 280, in 55 families.

References 

Populated places in Torbat-e Jam County